Events in the year 1961 in Turkey.

Parliament
 12th Parliament of Turkey (from 6 January)

Incumbents
President – Cemal Gürsel
Prime Minister
Cemal Gürsel (up to 26 October)
Fahri Özdilek, acting (26 October – 20 November)
 İsmet İnönü (from 20 November)
Leader of the opposition – Ekrem Alican (from 12 November)

Ruling party and the main opposition
  Ruling party – Republican People's Party (CHP) and coalition partner (Justice Party (AP))  (from 20 November)
  Main opposition – New Turkey Party (YTP) (from 20 November)

Cabinet
24th government of Turkey (up to 5 January)
25th government of Turkey (5 January – 20 November)
26th government of Turkey (from 20 November)

Events
 6 January – constituent assembly
 1 April – The ban on political activities was lifted
3 June – Fenerbahçe won the championship of Turkish football league.
9 July – Referendum on the new Turkish constitution (65% approved)
15 September – Verdicts (on the Democrat Party (DP) members) pronounced
16/17 September – Executions of Prime Minister Adnan Menderes, Minister of Foreign Affairs Fatin Rüştü Zorlu and Minister of Finance Hasan Polatkan
15 October – General elections (CHP 173 seats, AP 158 seats, YTP 65 seats, CKMP 54 seats)
26 October – Cemal Gürsel was elected as the new president. Fahri Özdilek was appointed as the acting prime minister.
20 November - Civilian government

Births
1 January – Edibe Sözen, politician
31 January – Fatih Kısaparmak, singer and songwriter
3 May – Leyla Zana, politician
15 June – Gülten Kışanak, politician
1 July – Birgül Ayman Güler, politician
17 December – Ersun Yanal, football coach

Deaths
8 January – Yaşar Doğu (aged 48), wrestler
26 February – Hasan Ali Yücel (aged 64), writer and former minister of National education
16 June – Peyami Safa (aged 62), writer and journalist
16 September – Hasan Polatkan (aged 46), former minister of Finance 
16 September – Fatin Rüştü Zorlu (aged 51), former minister of Foreign Affairs 
17 September – Adnan Menderes (aged 62), former prime minister (19th, 20th, 21st, 22nd, and 23rd government of Turkey)
19 September – Şemsettin Günaltay (aged 78), former prime minister (1940s)

Gallery

See also
 1960–61 Milli Lig

References

 
Years of the 20th century in Turkey